Irina Tretyakova (born 5 May 1987) is a Belarusian footballer who plays as a forward for Belarusian Premier League club FC Dnepr Mogilev. She has been a member of the Belarus women's national team.

References

1987 births
Living people
Women's association football forwards
Belarusian women's footballers
People from Mogilev
Belarus women's international footballers
Bobruichanka Bobruisk players
Universitet Vitebsk players
Sportspeople from Mogilev Region